Gold Apple (Zolotoe Yabloko) is a Russian chain of beauty stores, headquartered in Yekaterinburg.

By May 2022, Gold Apple ranks second in Russia in terms of sales in its segment.

History 
In 1996, the first 40 m² store was opened in Yekaterinburg. The first store in a "beauty supermarket" format was opened in 2004.

Gold Apple opened its first store in Moscow in 2017 and in Saint Petersburg in 2019. At May 2022, the chain has 31 stores in Moscow, St. Petersburg, Yekaterinburg, Perm, Rostov-on-Don, Volgograd, Novosibirsk, Nizhny Novgorod, Chelyabinsk, Kazan, Khabarovsk, Saratov and Samara, and an online store in Belarus. July 9, 2021 the first retail store opened outside of Russia, in Minsk, Belarus, and on March 20, 2022 in Almaty, Kazakhastan. The average selling space of supermarkets in Russia is 1,500 m². In December 2021, the company plans to open a 2,500 m² flagship store in the Neglinnaya Galereya mall in the city center of Moscow.

E-commerce 
In 2018, the company opened an online store. In the fall of 2020, the online store features were added to Gold Apple's mobile app. The online store offers more than 60 thousand products from 1,500 brands, including 84 exclusive brands and brands with narrow distribution.

Operations 
In 2019, the company's revenue was 16.8 billion rubles. Net profit was just over 124 million rubles. According to the results of 2020, the revenue of Gold Apple increased by half and reached 22.4 billion rubles. Net profit was 216.8 million rubles. Gold Apple is outperforming its competitors by revenue per square meter. At the end of 2021 the share of online sales is 30% of the company's total revenue. The consolidated revenue in 2021, according to its own data, amounted to 48 billion rubles.

References

External links 

 
Retail companies of Russia
Companies based in Yekaterinburg
Beauty stores
Retail companies established in 1996